Horse sacrifice is the ritual killing and offering of a horse, usually as part of a religious or cultural ritual. Horse sacrifices were common throughout Eurasia with the domestication of the horse and continuing up until the spread of Abrahamic religions, or in some places like Mongolia, of Buddhism. The practice is rarely observed in some cultures even today.

Many ethnic religions from Indo-European speaking peoples show evidence for horse sacrifice, and comparative mythology suggests that they derive from a purported Proto-Indo-European ritual and common root, though the practice is also observed among non-Indo-European speaking peoples, especially in nomadic societies from the Eurasian steppe.

Context
Horses are often sacrificed in a funerary context, and interred with the deceased, a practice called horse burial. There is evidence but no explicit myths from the three branches of Indo-Europeans of a major horse sacrifice ritual based on a speculated mythical union of Indo-European kingship and the horse. The Indian Aśvamedha is the clearest evidence preserved, but vestiges from Latin and Celtic traditions allow the reconstruction of a few common attributes.
 
Some scholars, including Edgar Polomé, regard the reconstruction of a purported common Proto-Indo-European ritual as unjustified due to the difference between the attested traditions.

Mythology 

The reconstructed myth involves the coupling of a king with a divine mare which produced the divine twins. A related myth is that of a hero magically twinned with a horse foaled at the time of his birth (for example Cuchulainn, Pryderi), suggested to be fundamentally the same myth as that of the divine twin horsemen by the mytheme of a "mare-suckled" hero from Greek and medieval Serbian evidence, or mythical horses with human traits (Xanthos), suggesting totemic identity of the hero or king with the horse.

Comparative rituals

Vedic (Indian)

Ashvamedha was a political ritual that was focused on the king's right to rule. The horse had to be a stallion and it would be permitted to wander for a year, accompanied by people of the king. If the horse roamed off into lands of an enemy then that territory would be taken by the king, and if the horse's attendants were killed in a fight by a challenger then the king would lose the right to rule. But if the horse stayed alive for a year then it was taken back to the king's court where it was bathed, consecrated with butter, decorated with golden ornaments and then sacrificed. After the completion of this ritual, the king would be considered as the undisputed ruler of the land which was covered by the horse.

the sacrifice is connected with the elevation or inauguration of a member of the Kshatriya warrior caste.
the ceremony took place in spring or early summer.
the horse sacrificed was a stallion which won a race at the right side of the chariot.
the horse sacrificed was white-colored with dark circular spots, or with a dark front part, or with a tuft of dark blue hair.
it was bathed in water, in which mustard and sesame are mixed.
it was suffocated alongside a hornless ram and a he-goat, among other animals.
the stallion was dissected along the "knife-paths" — with three knives made from gold, copper, and iron — and its portions awarded to various deities, symbolically invoking sky, atmosphere and earth, while other priests started reciting the verses of Vedas, seeking healing and rejuvenation for the horse.

Roman
 

The Roman Equus October ceremony involved:
the horse was dedicated to Mars, the Roman god of war 
the sacrifice took place on the Ides of October, but through ritual reuse was used in a spring festival (the Parilia)
two-horse chariot races determined the victim, which was the right-hand horse of the winning team
the horse is dismembered: the tail (cauda, possibly a euphemism for the penis) is taken to the Regia, the king's residence, while two factions battle for possession of the head as a talisman for the coming year

Irish

Following the 12th-century Anglo-Norman invasion of Ireland, Norman writer Gerald of Wales wrote in his Topographia Hibernica that the Irish kings of Tyrconnell were inaugurated with a horse sacrifice. He writes that a white mare was sacrificed and cooked into a broth, which the king bathed in and drank from: 

There is in a northern and remote part of Ulster, among the Kenelcunil, a certain tribe which is wont to install a king over itself by an excessively savage and abominable ritual. In the presence of all the people of this land in one place, a white mare is brought into their midst. Thereupon he who is to be elevated, not to a prince but to a beast, not to a king but to an outlaw, steps forward in beastly fashion and exhibits his bestiality. Right thereafter the mare is killed and boiled piecemeal in water, and in the same water a bath is prepared for him. He gets into the bath and eats of the flesh that is brought to him, with his people standing around and sharing it with him. He also imbibes the broth in which he is bathed, not from any vessel, nor with his hand, but only with his mouth. When this is done right according to such unrighteous ritual, his rule and sovereignty are consecrated.

This has been seen as propaganda meant to paint the Irish as a barbaric people and thus justify Anglo-Norman conquest. However, there may be some truth in the account, because there are mentions of similar horse sacrifices associated with kingship in India (the ashvamedha) and Scandinavia.

Norse
The Norse ceremony according to the description in Hervarar saga of the Swedish inauguration of Blot-Sweyn, the last or next to last pagan Germanic king, c. 1080: 
the horse is dismembered for eating
the blood is sprinkled on the sacred tree at Uppsala.

The Völsa þáttr mentions a Norse pagan ritual involving veneration of the penis of a slaughtered stallion. A freshly cut horse head was also used in setting up a nithing pole for a Norse curse.

The Gesta Danorum, Book V depicts several horse ritual themes in the short story of Aswid and Asmund.  A nobleman named Aswid died of illness.  He was buried with his horse, dog, and sworn companion Asmund.  Aswid reanimated, ate first his horse, then dog, and finally attacked Asmund before being decapitated and impaled.  Soon after, grave robbers entered Aswid's barrow, and chose by lot "one of the quickest of the youths" among them to descend the deep cave inside.  Asmund forcibly took the lad's place and returned to the company of the living.

Archaeology

The primary archaeological context of horse sacrifice are burials, notably chariot burials, but graves with horse remains reach from the Eneolithic well into historical times. Herodotus describes the execution of horses at the burial of a Scythian king, and Iron Age kurgan graves known to contain horses number in the hundreds. There are also frequent deposition of horses in burials in Iron Age India. The custom is by no means restricted to Indo-European populations, but is continued by Turkic tribes.

See also
Animal sacrifice
Domestication of the horse
Epona
Horse worship
Horse burial
Kurgan hypothesis
Parilia
Proto-Indo-European religion

Notes

References
 Dearborn, Fitzroy (1997). J. P. Mallory and Douglas Q. Adams (eds.), Encyclopedia of Indo-European Culture.

Further reading
 Alberro, Manuel (2003): «El mito y el ritual indoeuropeo de la yegua: paralelos entre la India aria, la Irlanda céltica y la antigua Grecia», Flor. Il. 14, pp. 9-34.
 Alberro, Manuel. (2004). "El rol del sacrificio del caballo en las estructuras míticas y religiosas de los pueblos indo-europeos relacionadas con el concepto dumeziliano tripartito de organización social". Habis, Nº 35, 2004, pags. 7-30. .
 Argent, Gala. "KILLING (CONSTRUCTED) HORSES – INTERSPECIES ELDERS, EMPATHY AND EMOTION, AND THE PAZYRYK HORSE SACRIFICES." In People with Animals: Perspectives and Studies in Ethnozooarchaeology, edited by Broderick Lee G. Oxford; Philadelphia: Oxbow Books, 2016. Accessed June 16, 2020. pp. 19-32. www.jstor.org/stable/j.ctvh1dr8g.6.
 Kaliff, Anders & Oestigaard, Terje (2020). The Great Indo-European Horse Sacrifice 4000 Years of Cosmological Continuity from Sintashta and the Steppe to Scandinavian Skeid. OCCASIONAL PAPERS IN ARCHAEOLOGY 72. Uppsala University. .

Sacrifice
Animal sacrifice
Nomadic groups in Eurasia
Proto-Indo-European mythology

it:Aśvamedha